The 2017 World Para Ice Hockey Championships for A-Pool teams (Canada, Germany, Italy, Norway, South Korea, Sweden, United States) was held in Gangneung, South Korea, from 11 April through 20 April 2017. The opening ceremony was held on 11 April and games were played from 12 April through 20 April, followed by the closing ceremony.

This event was previously known as the IPC Ice Sledge Hockey World Championships. On 30 November 2016, the International Paralympic Committee adopted the "World Para" brand across the ten sports it governs, the official name of the sport changed from "sledge hockey" to "Para ice hockey", and the event became the "World Para Ice Hockey Championships".

The World Championships for B-Pool teams (Czech Republic, Great Britain, Japan, Slovakia) was held at Hakucho Arena in Tomakomai, Japan, from 28 November to 3 December 2016.

A-Pool

Team rosters
 Canada
 Forwards: Rob Armstrong, Billy Bridges, Dominic Cozzolino, Ben Delaney, Liam Hickey, Tyler McGregor, Bryan Sholomicki, Corbyn Smith, Greg Westlake
 Defenders: Steve Arsenault, Brad Bowden, Adam Dixon, James Gemmell, Tyrone Henry, Kevin Sorley
 Goaltenders: Dominic Larocque, Corbin Watson

 Germany
 Forwards: Bas Disveld, Bernhard Hering, Ingo Kuhli-Lauenstein, Frank Rennhack, Udo Segreff, Joerg Wedde, Jacob Wolff
 Defenders: Matthias Albanus, Christian Jaster, Robert Pabst, Christian Pilz, Hugo Raedler, Lucas Sklorz, Sven Stumpe
 Goaltenders: Klaus Brzoska, Simon Kunst

 Italy
 Forwards: Alessandro Andreoni, Eusebiu Antochi, Valerio Corvino, Christoph Depaoli, Stephan Kafmann, Sandro Kalegaris, Nils Larch, Gregory Leperdi, Werner Winkler
 Defenders: Bruno Balossetti, Gianluca Cavaliere, Andrea Macri, Florian Planker, Roberto Radice, Gianluigi Rosa
 Goaltenders: Gabriele Araudo, Santino Stillitano

 Norway
 Forwards: Thommas Avdal, Audun Bakke, Magnus Bogle, Martin Hamre, Ola Oiseth, Tor Joakim Rivera, Loyd Remi Solberg, Emil Sorheim, Morten Vaernes, Emil Vatne
 Defenders: Thomas Jacobsen, Jan Roger Klakegg, Knut Andre Nordstoga, Rolf Einar Pedersen
 Goaltenders: Kissinger Deng, Kjell Christian Hamar

 South Korea

 Forwards: Cho Byeong-seok, Cho Young-jae, Choi Si-woo, Jang Jong-ho, Jung Seung-hwan, Lee Jong-kyung, Lee Ju-seung, Na Dae-seok, Ryu Jee-hyun
 Defenders: Choi Kwang-hyouk, Han Min-su, Jang Dong-shin, Kim Young-sung, Park Woo-chul
 Goaltenders: Lee Jae-woong, Yu Man-gyun

 Sweden
 Forwards: Goran Karlsson, Per Kasperi, Martin Magnevill, Robin Meng, Peter Nilsson, Peter Ojala, Filip Silvstrand Olsson, Niklas Rakos
 Defenders: Christian Hedberg, Marcus Holm, Niklas Ingvarsson, Rasmus Isaksson, Rasmus Lundgren
 Goaltenders: Andreas Neuman, Ulf Nilsson

 United States
 Forwards: Chris Douglas, Declan Farmer, Noah Grove, Luke McDermott, Kevin McKee, Adam Page, Rico Roman, Brody Roybal, Paul Schaus
 Defenders: Tyler Carron, Billy Hanning, Nikko Landeros, Josh Pauls, Jack Wallace, Andy Yohe
 Goaltenders: Steve Cash, Bo Reichenbach

Preliminary round
All times are local (UTC+9).

Final round

Fifth place game

Bronze medal game

Final

Final standings

Awards
Best players selected by the Directorate:
Best Goaltender:  Ulf Nilsson
Best Defenceman:  Adam Dixon
Best Forward:  Greg Westlake
Source: IPC

B-Pool

Preliminary round
All times are local (UTC+9).

Final round

Third place game

Final

Final standings

References

External links 
 
 Results book – A-Pool
 Results book – B-Pool

World Para Ice Hockey Championships
World Para Ice Hockey Championships